Rio Bravo is a colonia in Webb County, in the American state of Texas. It lies sixteen miles south of Laredo on Highway 83, and sits on the left bank of the Rio Grande. Founded in 1982 by the property developer Cecil McDonald (who also founded neighboring El Cenizo), Rio Bravo was incorporated as a city in 1989. It had a population of 4,794 at the 2010 census.

Geography

Rio Bravo is located at  (27.364817, –99.479349).

According to the United States Census Bureau, the city has a total area of 0.7 square mile (1.8 km), of which 0.7 square mile (1.8 km) is land and 1.45% is covered by water.

Demographics

2020 census

As of the 2020 United States census, there were 4,450 people, 1,141 households, and 797 families residing in the city.

2013
As of the updated census of 2013,  4,852 people, 1,204 households, and 1,122 families resided in the city. The population density was 8,153.4 people per square mile (3,153.0/km). The 1,347 housing units averaged 1,977.8/sq mi (764.8/km). The racial makeup of the city was 78.61% White, 0.34% African American, 0.99% Native American, 0.02% Asian, 0.02% Pacific Islander, 16.62% from other races, and 3.40% from two or more races. Hispanics or Latinos of any race were 97.69% of the population.

Of the 1,204 households, 70.7% had children under the age of 18 living with them, 74.1% were married couples living together, 15.2% had a female householder with no husband present, and 6.8% were not families. About 6.2% of all households were made up of individuals, and 2.6% had someone living alone who was 65 years of age or older. The average household size was 4.61, and the average family size was 4.82.

In the city, the population was distributed as 45.8% under the age of 18, 12.3% from 18 to 24, 25.8% from 25 to 44, 12.0% from 45 to 64, and 4.1% who were 65 years of age or older. The median age was 20 years. For every 100 females, there were 96.1 males. For every 100 females age 18 and over, there were 90.3 males.

The median income for a household in the city was $26,816.00 per family, and for a family was $17,513. Males had a median income of $14,265 versus $12,222 for females. The per capita income for the city was $4,566. About 53.4% of families and 57.6% of the population were below the poverty line, including 64.1% of those under age 18 and 55.1% of those age 65 or over.

Education
Rio Bravo is served by the United Independent School District.

All of Rio Bravo is zoned to Juarez-Lincoln Elementary School (which is located at the former United D.D. Hachar Elementary School), Salvador Garcia Middle School (Laredo), and Lyndon B. Johnson High School (Laredo). Garcia is adjacent to the Rio Bravo city limits.

The eastern half of Rio Bravo used to be zoned to United D.D. Hachar Elementary School in unincorporated Webb County. The western half used to be zoned to Juarez-Lincoln Elementary School in unincorporated Webb County. The Hachar Foundation donated the land on which the United DD Hachar school was built on in 1989. The former Juarez-Lincoln Elementary, which opened in 1993, is now used as Step Academy.

The designated community college for Webb County is Laredo Community College.

References

Cities in Webb County, Texas
Cities in Texas
Laredo–Nuevo Laredo